Erronea onyx, common name the onyx cowry, is a species of sea snail, a cowry, a marine gastropod mollusk in the family Cypraeidae, the cowries.

Description
The dorsum surface of Erronea onyx is smooth, shiny and generally golden brown, with alternating longitudinal fuzzy bands of translucent bluish and reddish colors (hence the Latin name onyx). The base and the margins are dark brown or black, sometimes the teeth are orange. In the living cowries mantle is dark brown, quite thin, with bluish papillae.

Distribution
This species occurs the Indian Ocean on the coasts of Aldabra, the Comores, Kenya, Madagascar, Mauritius, Mozambique, Réunion, the Seychelles,  Tanzania and in the Pacific Ocean along East China, Thailand, northern Australia, Indonesia, Philippines, Palau Islands and Solomon Islands.

Habitat
Erronea onyx lives in tropical and subtropical zones, in shallow subtidal water up to  depth, mainly in muddy areas or sandy sea floor, feeding on algae or coral polyps.

Subspecies
What used to be called Erronea onyx adusta,  Lamarck, 1810   is now accepted as Erronea adusta.

References

 Verdcourt, B. (1954). The cowries of the East African Coast (Kenya, Tanganyika, Zanzibar and Pemba). Journal of the East Africa Natural History Society 22(4) 96: 129-144, 17 pls.
 Burgess, C.M. (1970). The Living Cowries. AS Barnes and Co, Ltd. Cranbury, New Jersey

External links
 
 WoRMS
 Flmnh
 Clade

onyx
Gastropods described in 1758
Taxa named by Carl Linnaeus